Tryin' to Get There is the fourth studio album by American country music artist David Lee Murphy. It was released on March 23, 2004 on Audium Records. Its lead-off single "Loco", released in early 2004, was a Top 5 hit on the Billboard Hot Country Singles & Tracks charts. "Inspiration" was also released, but failed to make Top 40. Audium/Koch closed its country division in 2005.

Track listing
All songs written by David Lee Murphy and Kim Tribble, unless noted otherwise.
"I Like It Already" – 4:05
"Same Ol' Same Ol'" – 3:54
"Loco" – 3:07
"Own Little World" – 3:09
"Tryin' to Get There" (David Lee Murphy, Waylon Jennings) – 4:20
"Inspiration" (Murphy) – 3:59
featuring Lee Roy Parnell
"Ghost in the Jukebox" (Murphy) – 4:01
"She Always Said" – 3:47
"Mama's Last" – 3:31
"Beggin' for Affection" (Murphy) – 2:59
"Might Be Me" (Murphy) – 4:35
"Killin' the Pain" (Murphy, Tribble, Bill Rice) – 4:24

Personnel
Larry Beaird – acoustic guitar
Spady Brannan – bass guitar
Mike Brignardello – bass guitar
Pat Buchanan – electric guitar, harmonica
J. T. Corenflos – acoustic guitar, electric guitar
Thom Flora – background vocals
Steve Hinson – steel guitar
Paul Leim – drums
Gordon Mote – keyboards
David Lee Murphy – lead vocals, background vocals, acoustic guitar
Jimmy Nichols – keyboards
Russ Pahl – acoustic guitar, electric guitar, steel guitar
Lee Roy Parnell – slide guitar and background vocals on "Inspiration"
Dave Pomeroy – bass guitar
Paul Scholten – drums, percussion
Hank Singer – fiddle, mandolin
Russell Terrell – background vocals
Kim Tribble – background vocals

Chart performance

References
[ Tryin' to Get There] at Allmusic

2004 albums
E1 Music albums
David Lee Murphy albums